Maria dos Santos Lima da Costa Tebús Torres (born 2 September 1958) is a São Toméan politician. She was born in the village of Santa Filomena in the island of São Tomé. Since 21 April 2006, she has been the country's Deputy Prime Minister and Minister of Planning and Finance in the government of Tomé Vera Cruz. She also held the position of Minister of Planning and Finance from 2002 to August 2003.

Tebus is a member of the Democratic Convergence Party-Reflection Group (PCD-GR).

References

1958 births
Living people
Democratic Convergence Party (São Tomé and Príncipe) politicians
Women government ministers of São Tomé and Príncipe
21st-century women politicians
Deputy prime ministers
Female finance ministers
21st-century São Tomé and Príncipe politicians